The Tășad (also: Valea Mare) is a left tributary of the river Crișul Repede in Romania. It discharges into the Crișul Repede in Oșorhei, near Oradea.

References

Rivers of Romania
Rivers of Bihor County